Stanislav Mikhailovich Prokofyev (born 15 February 1987) is a Russian professional football player. He plays as a striker.

Club career
He made his Russian Premier League debut for FC Amkar Perm on 17 September 2016 in a game against FC Terek Grozny.

Career statistics

Club

Notes

External links
 
 

1987 births
People from Tyumen
Living people
Russian footballers
Association football forwards
FC Tyumen players
FC Volga Nizhny Novgorod players
FC Mordovia Saransk players
FC Luch Vladivostok players
FC Tosno players
FC SKA-Khabarovsk players
FC Amkar Perm players
FC Orenburg players
Russian Premier League players
FC Volga Ulyanovsk players
Sportspeople from Tyumen Oblast